Chamod Wickramasuriya (born 27 May 1999) is a Sri Lankan cricketer. He made his Twenty20 debut on 15 January 2020, for Galle Cricket Club in the 2019–20 SLC Twenty20 Tournament.

References

External links
 

1999 births
Living people
Sri Lankan cricketers
Galle Cricket Club cricketers
Place of birth missing (living people)